Ilinca is a Romanian feminine given name. It is related to the names Elena and Ileana. Ilinca may refer to:

Ilinca Băcilă

References

Romanian feminine given names